was a Japanese actor and comedian born in Kotesashi Village (now part of Tokorozawa), Iruma District, Saitama Prefecture, Japan. He appeared in such films as Akira Kurosawa's Seven Samurai, The Lower Depths and Ikiru. Hidari was famous among Japanese audiences for his portrayals of meek, downtrodden men, and although a teetotaller, was renowned for his convincing drunk scenes (see esp. "Ikiru").

Filmography

References

External links

1894 births
1971 deaths
People from Tokorozawa, Saitama
Japanese male film actors